Topical outline of articles about Slavic history and culture. This outline is an overview of Slavic topics; for outlines related to specific Slavic groups and topics, see the links in the Other Slavic outlines section below.

Slavs are the largest European ethnolinguistic group. They speak the various Slavic languages, belonging to the larger Balto-Slavic branch of the Indo-European languages. Slavs are geographically distributed throughout northern Eurasia, mainly inhabiting Central and Eastern Europe, the Balkans, and Siberia. A large Slavic minority is also scattered across the Baltic states and Central Asia, and from the late 19th century, a substantial Slavic diaspora is found throughout the Americas.

Human geography
 Slavs
 East Slavs, West Slavs, South Slavs
 Antes people, Braničevci, Buzhans, Carantanians, Guduscani, Melingoi, Merehani, Slavs in Lower Pannonia, Praedenecenti, Sclaveni, Sebbirozi, Seven Slavic tribes, Severians, Zeriuani, Znetalici
 Belarusians, Bosniaks, Bulgarians, Croats, Czechs, Kashubians, Macedonians, Montenegrins, Poles, Russians, Rusyns, Slovaks, Serbs, Slovenes, Sorbs, Ukrainians
 Slavic names, Slavic name suffixes
 Slavic Americans

History
Articles about Slavic history before the Mongol invasions of Slavic lands. For later periods, see outlines for individual Slavic groups.

Subjects
 Slavic migrations to the Balkans
 History of the Slavic languages

Tribes and peoples

 Early Slavs
 Gorani people
 Great Moravia
 Kievan Rus'
 Samo's Empire
 Seven Slavic tribes
 Slavic Pomeranians
 Slavs in Lower Pannonia

Individuals
 Nestor the Chronicler

Culture
Articles about general Slavic culture. For articles about specific Slavic cultures (e.g. Polish, Ukrainian.), see outlines for individual Slavic groups.

Society
 Veche
 Slavic carnival

Literature and writing
 Slavic literature
 Pre-Christian Slavic writing
 Slavic mythology
 Slavic studies

Language
 History of the Slavic languages
 Balto-Slavic languages, Slavic languages, East Slavic languages, South Slavic languages, West Slavic languages
 History of the Slavic languages, Proto-Balto-Slavic language, Proto-Slavic language, History of Proto-Slavic, Proto-Slavic borrowings
 Old Church Slavonic, Church Slavonic
 Old East Slavic
 Interslavic
 Pan-Slavic language
 Slavic microlanguages
Orthography
 Glagolitic script, Relationship of Cyrillic and Glagolitic scripts, Proto-Slavic accent
 Macedonian language

Religion
 Christianization of the Slavs
 Slavic paganism, Slavic Native Faith
 Slavic Native Faith's theology and cosmology, Slavic Native Faith's identity and political philosophy, Slavic Native Faith and Christianity, Slavic Native Faith's calendars and holidays
 Slavic Native Faith in Ukraine, Slavic Native Faith in Poland, Slavic Native Faith in Russia
 Zhrets, Volkhv
 Peterburgian Vedism

Deities
 Morana (goddess)
 Mokosh

Folklore
 Lech, Czech, and Rus'
 Kyi, Shchek and Khoryv

Symbols

Chronicles
 Primary Chronicle
 Ioachim Chronicle

Holidays
 Kupala Night
 Koliada
 Maslenitsa

Lists

 List of Slavic cultures
 List of ancient Slavic peoples
 List of Slavic studies journals
 List of Slavic deities, List of Slavic pseudo-deities
 List of Balto-Slavic languages
 List of tribes and states in Belarus, Russia and Ukraine
 List of Glagolitic manuscripts
 List of Glagolitic books
 List of Slavic Native Faith's organisations

Other

 Slavophilia
 Anti-Slavic sentiment
 Slavicization
 Pan-Slavism
 Slavs (ethnonym)
 Gord (archaeology)

Other Slavic outlines

 Outline of Belarus
 Outline of Bosnia and Herzegovina
 Outline of Bulgaria
 Outline of Croatia
 Outline of the Czech Republic
 Outline of Montenegro
 Outline of North Macedonia
 Outline of Poland
 Outline of Russia
 Outline of Serbia
 Outline of Slovakia
 Outline of Slovenia
 Outline of Ukraine
 Outline of the Soviet Union
 Outline of Yugoslavia

See also
 Timeline of Slavic history

References

Notes

Citations

Bibliography

External links

 Slavic Review (1941–present); Slavic Review was previously published as Slavonic Yearbook American Series (1941), Slavonic and East European Review American Series (1943–1944), and American Slavic and East European Review (1945–1961). Published quarterly by Cambridge University Press; the journal is a publication of the Association for Slavic, East European, and Eurasian Studies;  (online),  (print).
 Slavonic and East European Review (1922–1927, 1928–present); Previously published as The Slavonic Review (1922–1927). Published by the Modern Humanities Research Association and University College London, School of Slavonic and East European Studies;  (print),  (online).